An impi is a Zulu regiment.

Impi may also refer to:

IP Multimedia Private Identity
Internal Microprogrammed Interface, an instruction set architecture of the IBM System/38 and early IBM AS/400 systems.
International Microwave Power Institute
Mexican Institute of Industrial Property (Spanish: Instituto Mexicano de la Propiedad Industrial)
Impi Lukkarinen (1918–2010), Finnish journalist and politician
Impi Visser (born 1995), South African rugby sevens player